Alta Vista High School is a continuation high school that is part of the Mountain View-Los Altos Union High School District. Their staff includes one principal, two counselor/teachers, six full-time teachers, three instructional aides, a director of coordinated services/case management, CHAC/AACI counselors, Stanford Medical School support staff, an office manager, and a technical support. The school's mascot is an Aztec.

See also 
 Mountain View-Los Altos Union High School District

External links 
Official website

Mountain View–Los Altos Union High School District
Continuation high schools in California
High schools in Santa Clara County, California
Buildings and structures in Mountain View, California
Public high schools in California